Montenegrina cattaroensis is a species of air-breathing land snail, a terrestrial pulmonate gastropod mollusk in the family Clausiliidae, the door snails, all of which have a clausilium.

Distribution and conservation status
This species is not listed in the IUCN Red List and not evaluated (NE)

The species occurs in:
 Yugoslavia (including Serbia, Kosovo, Voivodina, Montenegro)

References

Clausiliidae
Endemic fauna of Montenegro
Molluscs of Europe
Gastropods described in 1835